The men's 1500 metres at the 1934 European Athletics Championships was held in Turin, Italy, at the  Stadio Benito Mussolini on 7 September 1934.

Medalists

Results

Final
7 September

Heats
7 September

Heat 1

Heat 2

Heat 3

Participation
According to an unofficial count, 14 athletes from 11 countries participated in the event.

 (1)
 (1)
 (1)
 (2)
 (1)
 (2)
 (1)
 (1)
 (2)
 (1)
 (1)

References

1500
1500 metres at the European Athletics Championships